The Carousel of Life (German: Das Karussell des Lebens) is a 1919 German silent drama film directed by Georg Jacoby and starring Pola Negri, Harry Liedtke, and Reinhold Schünzel. In the United States, it is also known by the alternative title of The Last Payment. It is now considered to be a lost film.

It was shot at the Tempelhof Studios in Berlin.

Plot
As described in a film magazine, Iola, a beautiful woman of the Latin Quarter, marries a rich cattle owner Pedro Maurez from South America to live in peace and happiness. The arrival of young Parisian Paul Durand whets her interest again in the old haunts of Paris. When her husband is slain in an uprising of laborers, she is again thrown on her own resources. She travels to Paris with the young businessman and, upon their arrival, she is sheltered by the youth's father Henri (Patry). Here she meets her former husband Jules Lambert who is secretary to Henri. The former husband, by his wife Iola's extravagance, had been led to defaulting trust funds. Her host and son both fall in love with her and her former husband stands like a Nemesis in the background. On the night of a carnival, where Iola is made queen of the festivities, the secretary confesses his past to Paul, telling of his imprisonment for larceny and his efforts to live down his past. Paul steps up to box at the carnival and sees his father embrace Iola. So horrified is the young man at the sight and of his own unrequited love that he kills himself almost at the feet of the couple. But Iola is feted and showered with flowers until the grim tragedy drives her from the ball room and into the night. She is confused and falls before a train, making her last payment.

Cast
Pola Negri as Iola
Harry Liedtke as Paul Durand
Reinhold Schünzel as Jules Lambert
Leopold von Ledebur as Pedro Maurez
Albert Patry (uncredited)

References

External links

Films of the Weimar Republic
German silent feature films
Films directed by Georg Jacoby
German black-and-white films
UFA GmbH films
German drama films
1919 drama films
Lost German films
Films shot at Tempelhof Studios
1919 lost films
Lost drama films
Silent drama films
1910s German films
1910s German-language films